Indonesia and the Netherlands established diplomatic relations in 1949. Both countries share a special relationship, embedded in their shared history of colonial interactions for centuries. It began during the spice trade as the Netherlands established the Dutch East Indies Company (VOC) trading post in what is now Indonesia, before colonising it as the Dutch East Indies until the mid 20th century. Indonesia was the largest former Dutch colony. In the early 21st century, the Dutch government has committed to boosting its relationship with Indonesia, noting that economic, political, and interpersonal contacts should be further strengthened.

History

de Houtman siblings (aka Cornelis de Houtman & Frederick de Houtman), was a Dutch explorer who discovered shipping routes from Europe to Indonesia and successfully started the spice trade Dutch spices. In 1592, Cornelis de Houtman was sent by the merchants of Amsterdam to Lisboa to find as much information as possible about the Spice Islands (today in Maluku). By the time de Houtman returned to Amsterdam, the traders confirmed that Banten was the most appropriate place to buy spices. In 1594, they established the Compagnie van Verre (it means "long distance company"), and on 2 April 1595, four ships left Amsterdam: Amsterdam, Hollandia, Mauritius and Duyfken.
Cornelis de Houtman and his fleet arrived on 27 June 1596 in Banten waters, then returned on 14 August 1597 brought 240 bags of pepper, 45 tonnes of nutmeg, and 30 bales of mace. 

In 1603, the VOC commenced operations in what is now Indonesia where it fought wars to expand its domain. Though Indonesian history featured other European colonial powers, it was the Dutch who solidified their hold on the archipelago. After VOC's bankruptcy in 1800, the Netherlands took control of the archipelago in 1826. Following this, they also fought against the natives and then enforced a period of forced labour and indentured servitude until 1870 when, in 1901, they adopted the "Dutch Ethical Policy and Indonesian National Revival," which included a somewhat increased investment in indigenous education and modest political reforms. Only in the 20th century, however, was Dutch rule enhanced to what would become Indonesia. Following Japanese occupation during World War II, the Netherlands tried to re-establish their rule, amid a bitter armed and diplomatic struggle that ended in December 1949. International pressure then forced the Dutch to formally recognise Indonesian independence. In 1960, the government of Indonesia, led by Sukarno, cut off all diplomatic ties with the Netherlands, ties that were restored only in 1968 by the New Order government.

High-level visits

In 1970, Indonesian President Soeharto paid an official visit to the Netherlands, which was reciprocated by Dutch Queen Juliana and Prince Bernhard royal visit to Indonesia in 1971. Queen Beatrix and Prince Claus also paid a royal visit to Indonesia in 1995. On 22 April 2016, President Joko Widodo paid an official visit to the Netherlands. On 10 March 2020, King Willem-Alexander paid a royal visit to Indonesia and made surprise apologies for excessive violence used during the early years of Indonesian independence.

Political ties
In the past, relations between the two have been marred by the separatist intentions of the Free Papua Movement and the Republic of South Maluku. In this vein, they have attacked targets in the Netherlands in the 1970s and 1980s, seeking to force the country to pressure Indonesia into allowing for the secession of their nation. Political ties were then strained as Indonesian officials refused to visit the Netherlands while the group was allowed to bring cases to court against them. However, the visit of the Dutch Minister of Foreign Affairs Bernard Bot to Indonesia in 2005 to celebrate its 60th independence day anniversary was claimed by the Netherlands to have "marked a[n] historic moment in the relations between the two countries. After this visit, the relations between Indonesia and the Netherlands was further intensified and strengthened by the extension of the cooperation in a wide range of fields."

In 2010, Indonesian President Susilo Bambang Yudhoyono cancelled a visit to the Netherlands after the group's activists asked a Dutch court to issue an arrest warrant for him. The move was condemned by pro-Indonesia Moluccan activists in Jakarta.

Economy and trade

The Netherlands is one of Indonesia's most important trade partners in Europe. Trade between the two countries between January and September 2012 reached US$3.314 billion, while efforts are currently underway to further boost that figure. The Port of Rotterdam and Schiphol Airport have been the main entry points for Indonesian products into the European Union. Similarly, Dutch companies have seen Indonesia as their gateway to the larger ASEAN market, which is home to more than 500 million people.

Development assistance
For over 25 years, from 1966 to 1992, development assistance was provided by the Netherlands to Indonesia within the arrangements of the Inter-Governmental Group on Indonesia (IGGI). IGGI had been established in the late 1960s to help coordinate the flow of foreign aid to Indonesia and was convened and chaired by the Dutch government for over two decades throughout the 1970s and 1980s. However, in the early 1990s, the then-Minister for Development Cooperation in the Netherlands, Jan Pronk, became increasingly critical of domestic policy in Indonesia. In response, in early 1992, the Indonesian government indicated that it no longer wished to participate in the annual IGGI meetings in The Hague and preferred that a new donor consultative group, the Consultative Group on Indonesia (CGI), be established and be chaired by the World Bank. Initially, the Netherlands was not invited to attend CGI meetings. Later, the Netherlands became a member of the group.

Military ties
The Indonesian military procures naval vessels from the Dutch, such as Van Speijk-class frigates and Sigma-class corvettes.

Cultural relations

Traces of Dutch influences in Indonesia include Dutch origin loanwords in Indonesian and cuisine. Some Indonesian dishes have been adopted and, in turn, influenced Dutch cuisine. Though cultural relations are no longer strong, Christianity in Indonesia was a result of proselytisation by mainly Dutch missionaries. There is also a sizable Indonesian population in the Netherlands. Many have set up their own churches in what has been termed as a "reverse mission," referring to the Dutch missionaries in the colonies.

Another legacy of colonial rule in Indonesia is the legal system that was inherited from the Dutch. In 2009, the Dutch Minister of Justice Ernst Hirsch Ballin visited Indonesia in what some considered a stepping stone to reforming its legal system.

Through centuries of colonial relations, numbers of cultural institutions in the Netherlands — such as Tropenmuseum and Rijksmuseum voor Volkenkunde in Leiden — have extensive collections of Indonesian archaeology and ethnology artefacts. Both are the leading centres of Indonesian studies in Europe, specialised in its culture, history, archaeology and ethnography. The Erasmus Huis — the Netherlands' cultural centre — was established in 1970 in Jakarta. It was meant as cultural cooperation to promote art and cultural exchanges between Indonesia and the Netherlands. Besides many exhibitions, music performances and films screenings, some lectures on Dutch and Indonesian culture are being held on a regular basis in their auditorium and gallery.

Resident diplomatic missions

 Indonesia has an embassy in The Hague.
 Netherlands has an embassy in Jakarta.

Famous Dutch-Indonesians
Giovanni van Bronckhorst
Boudewijn de Groot
Irfan Bachdim
Alex Van Halen
Eddie Van Halen
Daniel Sahuleka
Nyck de Vries
Geert Wilders

See also 
Foreign relations of Indonesia 
Foreign relations of the Netherlands 
Netherlands East Indies Corporation
Indo people
Netherlands East Indies
Netherlands-Indonesian Union

References

External links
Indonesian Netherlands Association

 
Netherlands
Bilateral relations of the Netherlands
Relations of colonizer and former colony